The 1983 United Kingdom general election in Wales took place on 9 June 1983 for all 38 Welsh seats to the House of Commons. The Labour Party again won a majority of Welsh MPs, but the party's vote share declined by 9.4% and they lost three seats. In this election popular vote and percentage gap produced between Labour and Conservative parties will be the smallest one up until 2019 UK general election.

Despite the Labour party winning the most votes in Wales, the Conservatives won the general election.

The governing Conservatives made a net gain of two seats, with the SDP–Liberal Alliance gaining one. Across the UK the Conservatives won a landslide majority and continued in office for a second term.

Results
Below is a table summarising the results of the 1983 general election in Wales.

Background and aftermath 
Thatcher was a controversial figure in Wales. In 1983 Thatcher launched the election campaign at a rally in Cardiff attempting to appeal to Labour voters. She led the Conservative Party to its best general election result in Wales with 14 seats.

In 1985 Thatcher began her coal mine closing programme. She closed multiple mines in South Wales including; Aberpergwm, Abertillery, Bedwas, Garw, Margam, Penrhiwceiber, St Johns and Treforgan. In 1986 Thatcher also closed Bersham, Cwm and Nantgarw coal mines.

In response to the closures, one Welsh union worker said: "Thatcher killed, killed this town… we were always tainted with that brush of, of what Thatcher did to us to be quite honest." The closures led to decades of unemployment, under-employment, ill health, increased crime, increased drug use and a lack of hope in the Welsh valleys. Many parts of the valleys are still yet to fully recover from these effects.

Notes

References

1983 in Wales
1980s elections in Wales
1983
Wales